The Deliverance of Arsinoe is a 1555–56 painting by Tintoretto, now in the Gemäldegalerie Alte Meister in Dresden. It shows Arsinoe IV of Egypt fleeing from Alexandria after Julius Caesar arrived in the city in 48 BC and sided with Arsinoe's half-sister Cleopatra.

External links
The painting at the Staatliche Kunstsammlungen Dresden

1556 paintings
Paintings by Tintoretto
Collections of the Gemäldegalerie Alte Meister
Ships in art